Macho ya Mji ("City Eyes" in Swahili) is a Kenyan comic by Ruth Wairimu Karani and Kham.

The comic, first published on 26 March 1998 by Sasa Sema Publications, stars two boys and a blind beggar in Nairobi. The group tries to stop crimes and assist the police. The comic includes Swahili proverbs (methali) written in contemporary Kenyan slang.

References

External links
 Macho ya Mji page

Kenyan comics
1998 comics debuts
Child characters in comics
Crime comics